The Ratho Rail crash occurred on 3 January 1917 and killed 12 people. It occurred near Ratho Station in Scotland when an express collided with a light engine in stormy weather.

Just west of the station lay Queensferry Junction where the line from Dalmeny via Kirkliston (now lifted) joined from the north. A train from Dalmeny came to a stand opposite the junction signalbox. The signalman had intended to keep it there until the 16:18 express from Edinburgh to Glasgow had passed. However he did not inform the driver and there was no fixed signal to hold him, instead a system of hand-signals was in use. The engine uncoupled and began to move towards the main line without his instructions. He put the main line signals to danger and blew his whistle but was unable to attract the driver's attention in the stormy conditions. The express, headed by NBR H class locomotive 874 Dunedin, was heavily laden with people returning from their New Year's holiday including many soldiers.

The Board of Trade enquiry led by Colonel J. W. Pringle found that the unsafe use of hand-signals to control access to passenger lines was the cause of the disaster.

References

 
 
 

Train collisions in Scotland
Railway accidents in 1917
1917 in Scotland
Transport in West Lothian
History of West Lothian
Accidents and incidents involving Edinburgh and Glasgow Railway
1917 disasters in the United Kingdom
January 1917 events